Tell It Like It Tis is an album led by organist Richard "Groove" Holmes recorded in 1961 and 1962 and released on the Pacific Jazz label in 1966.

Reception

The Allmusic review by Michael Erlewine states: "this is classy soul jazz".

Track listing 
 "Hittin' the Jug" (Gene Ammons) - 7:15
 "Blow the Man Down" (Traditional) - 5:38
 "Denice" (Richard "Groove" Holmes) - 3:18
 "Later" (Sil Austin, Tiny Bradshaw, Henry Glover) - 4:32
 "This Here" (Bobby Timmons, Bob Dorough) - 3:30
 "Secret Love" (Sammy Fain, Paul Francis Webster) - 6:35
 "It Might as Well Be Spring" (Richard Rodgers, Oscar Hammerstein II) - 5:15
 "Licks A Plenty" (Eddie "Lockjaw" Davis) - 4:05
Recorded at Pacific Jazz Studios in Hollywood, CA in March, 1961 (track 8), The Black Orchid in Los Angeles, CA, on August 15, 1961 (track 1), unidentified studios in Los Angeles, CA in 1961 (tracks 2-4 & 6) and 1962 (tracks 5 & 7).

Personnel 
Richard "Groove" Holmes - organ
Tricky Lofton - trombone (track 8)
Gene Ammons (track 1), Ben Webster (track 8) - tenor saxophone
Les McCann - piano (track 8)
Gene Edwards (tracks 1-4 & 6), George Freeman (track 8), Joe Pass (tracks 5 & 7) - guitar
Leroy Henderson (tracks 1-4 & 6), Ron Jefferson (track 8), Lawrence Marable (tracks 5 & 7) - drums

References 

Richard Holmes (organist) albums
1966 albums
Pacific Jazz Records albums